Spilt Milk (original title in Portuguese: Leite Derramado) is a novel written by Chico Buarque.

Synopsis 
A very old man is in a hospital bed. A member of a traditional Brazilian family, he presents the history of his family in a monologue addressed to his daughter, the nurses, and anyone else who will listen. He follows his family's path from his Portuguese ancestors, including a baron of the Empire, and a First Republic's Senator, down to his grandson, a youth from Rio de Janeiro. His family saga is characterized by social and economic decadence against the background  of Brazilian history over the last two centuries.

Awards and Recognitions
Voted best book of 2009 by readers of O Globo.
2010 São Paulo Prize for Literature — Shortlisted in the Best Book of the Year category

Editions
Brazilian edition
Leite Derramado, São Paulo, SP: Companhia das Letras, 2009. 
Translations
English translation by Alison Entrekin, Spilt Milk, New York, NY: Grove Press, 2012. 
French translation by Geneviève Leibrich, Quand je sortirai d'ici, Paris: Gallimard, 2011. 
German translation by Karin von Schweder-Schreiner, Vergossene Milch, Frankfurt am Main: S. Fischer, 2013. 
Hebrew translation by Erela Talenberg Lerer, חלב שנשפך,  Israel,  Xargol Books, Ltd., 2017 
Italian translation by Roberto Francavilla, Latte versato, Milano: Feltrinelli, 2010. 
Spanish translation by Ana Rita da Costa García, Leche derramada, Barcelona: Salamandra, 2010.

References

2009 novels
Brazilian historical novels
Family saga novels
Novels set in Brazil